Örtülü is a village in Gülnar district of  Mersin Province, Turkey. At  it is situated in  the forests of Toros Mountains to the north of Gülnar. The population of the village was 236  as of 2012. Main economic activities of the village is ovine breeding and agriculture.

References

Villages in Gülnar District